Palle is a surname. Notable people with the surname include:

 Albert Palle (1916 - 2007), French writer 
 Mogens Palle (1934 – 2022), Danish professional boxing promoter and manager
 Sébastien Palle (born 1961), French writer

See also 

 Palle (given name)
 Palle (disambiguation)